The Chrysler R platform was introduced for the 1979 model year.  The first example of downsizing of the full-size Chrysler sedan line, the R-body is an evolution of the B-body intermediate chassis.  Competing against the downsized General Motors B-body chassis and the all-new Ford Panther chassis, the R-body is the longest-wheelbase of the three.  In contrast to Ford and GM, Chrysler only marketed the R-body as a four-door sedan.

Produced for only three years, the production run of the R-body chassis was far shorter than its competitors (GM B-body, 19 years; Ford Panther; 32 years).  For 1982, Chrysler ended sales of the R-body chassis, marketing the M-body chassis for its largest sedans.

Background
As the middle of the 1970s approached, Chrysler was facing an increasingly worrisome organizational and financial situation due to a combination of internal and external factors. The company had suffered the embarrassment of releasing new, bulkier full-sized C-body models for 1974 which promptly flopped due to the 1973 OPEC oil embargo, and unable to fix the mounting difficulties beyond unsuccessful sales incentives, chairman Lynn Townsend took early retirement and left the reins to John Ricardo. By 1976, Chrysler had exhausted its cash reserves and had to pay for all operating costs with purely sales revenue. Ricardo attempted to seek a bailout from the Federal government to the tune of $7.5 billion, but President Jimmy Carter immediately turned him down.

Then in September 1976, GM released new, radically downsized standard cars which were nearly  shorter and lighter by almost 700 pounds. The Chevrolet Caprice won Motor Trend Magazine's Car Of The Year Award and quickly became the best-selling car in America. Lacking the resources for a similar undertaking (GM had spent $600 million on the project), Chrysler was forced to respond in a more modest way.

The full-sized C-body Dodge and Plymouth lines were dropped for 1978, in part because they were finding few customers outside the fleet market (the C-body Chryslers lasted one more year). At this point, the mid-sized B-body Monaco and Fury were left as Chrysler's largest cars, but an outdated design that could not compete with GM and also by that point were more popular with police departments than private buyers.

During this time, the R-body project commenced which essentially amounted to taking the same old B-body platform that had its origins in the "downsized" standard Plymouths and Dodges of 1962 and grafting a new, more modern body onto them to create an ersatz challenger to the Chevrolet Caprice. There was considerable dispute over the cars' final appearance. GM had not only made its downsized big cars smaller, but styled them to look less ponderous. However, in the end, it was decided to retain a heavier "big car" look on the R-bodies with blocky, imposing lines. A variety of engineering measures were employed to the old warhorse B-body platform to reduce weight, improve reliability, and modernize components. Big-block engines vanished, and power trains now comprised the 225-cid Slant Six, 318 cid V8, and 360 cid V8 (unavailable in California because of emissions regulations) mated to the 3-speed Torqueflite automatic transmission. This done, Chrysler retired the B-body Dodge Monaco and Plymouth Fury along with the C-body Chrysler Newport and New Yorker at the close of the 1978 model year.

However, the company was still facing a dire financial situation and it was obvious that new blood was needed, especially as President Carter had written off Chrysler's management as incompetent and made it clear that no federal bailout would happen so long as the status quo were maintained. Thus, Lee Iacocca was hired as company president in July 1978 three months after his expulsion from Ford. John Ricardo held onto his position as chairman for another year, but his presence merely stood in the way of the hoped-for federal bailout, thus he summarily resigned in early 1979 with Iacocca assuming his position.  By the summer of 1980 Chrysler Corporation through ardent negotiations with Congress secured a $1.5 billion loan guarantee, which allowed the company to put into production the K-Car line and intensify development of the Minivan line of vehicles.

Models

Billed as "pillared hardtops", all R-body vehicles were available as four-door sedans only. No coupe, convertible, or station wagon was offered; Chrysler could not afford to develop these additional body styles. Most R-body models were built at the Lynch Road Plant in Detroit.

The 17-year-old platform that the R-bodies used was hidden by the design and engineering changes mentioned above, although the cars ended up being three inches (76 mm)  longer than the B-body Dodge Monaco and Plymouth Fury. Initial sales started off strong, and proceeded that way for most of the 1979 model year, with just over 121,000 produced and sold. However, in the spring of 1979, the Iranian Revolution was in full swing. Gas prices rose sharply, and the US economy plunged into a deep recession that would last for the next three years. Sales of the R-bodies sank abruptly for the 1980 and 1981 model years, and never recovered. The line was initially planned to be dropped after the 1980 model year, but strong protest from the fleet community (especially police departments) gave the R-body line a short reprieve for 1981.

Initially, there was no Plymouth version of the R-body as company production manager Eugene Cafiero decided to pull the plug on all Plymouths larger than the Volare. This decision had apparently sound reasoning in that it reduced expenses at a time when Chrysler could ill-afford to waste money and because sales of the B- and C-body Plymouths had been rather minuscule outside the fleet market. However, Plymouth dealers objected to this since they had no entry in the fleet market now. Substituting for Plymouth was a stripped Chrysler Newport offered for the police market, which ended up proving quite popular with law enforcement agencies. Chrysler bowed to pressure and brought back an R-body Plymouth Gran Fury for the 1980 model year.

The R-bodies proved quite popular with police departments, who especially appreciated the cars handling, and the attention paid to interior space and comfort. Mechanical reliability was also significantly better than the B-body Dodges and Plymouths, which suffered an alarming drop in quality control starting in 1976. On the other hand, big-block engines were gone and the 195 hp 360 V8 was now the standard power plant for Chrysler's police pursuit package. The E58 code police spec 360 V8; equipped with a four-barrel carburetor, dual exhausts, and a mild camshaft, could propel the cars to 120 mph (actual police testing yielded  for the St Regis), which was respectable if somewhat less than 440 V8-equipped B-bodies which had been able to attain .

As noted above, California's stricter emissions requirements ruled out the sale of 360 V8-equipped vehicles, and no exception was made for law enforcement agencies, which were forced to use the inadequate 318 V8, even though it was equipped with a 4-barrel carburetor. A fully loaded Dodge St. Regis pursuit car with this engine struggled to reach  and proved nearly useless except for police vehicles used in city areas. But after the R-body line was dropped in 1982 and Chrysler switched over to the smaller M-body Dodge Diplomat for police use, the 318 V8 proved sufficient.

Sales

References

R